Gilroy Road station is a Baltimore Light Rail station located in an industrial park in Hunt Valley, Maryland. It opened in 1997 as part of the system's northern extension. The station has two side platforms serving two tracks.

References

External links

MTA Maryland - Light Rail stations
Station from Google Maps Street View

Baltimore Light Rail stations
Hunt Valley, Maryland
Railway stations in Baltimore County, Maryland
1997 establishments in Maryland
Railway stations in the United States opened in 1997